Leptoporus is a genus of polypore fungi. The type species, Leptoporus mollis, is widespread throughout north temperate areas.

Although traditionally classified in the family Polyporaceae, recent molecular phylogenetic analysis supports the placement of Leptoporus  in the Irpicaceae.

Species
Leptoporus alutaeformis Pat. (1920)
Leptoporus apalus (Cooke) Pat. (1900)
Leptoporus bulgaricus Pilát (1937)
Leptoporus canaliculatus (Pat.) Pat. (1900)
Leptoporus coriolus D.A.Reid (1963)
Leptoporus dalmaticus Pilát (1953)
Leptoporus lindtneri Pilát (1938)
Leptoporus micantiformis Pilát (1936)
Leptoporus mollis (Pers.) Quél. (1886)
Leptoporus pallidocervinus (Schwein.) Pat. (1903)
Leptoporus schulzeri (Bourdot & Galzin) Pilát (1938)
Leptoporus werneri Pilát (1939)

References

Polyporales genera
Irpicaceae
Taxa described in 1886